This is a list of cities and towns in the Eastern Cape province of South Africa.

In the case of settlements that have had their official names changed the traditional name is listed first followed by the new name.

Amatola Region

 Adelaide (iKhobonqaba)
 Alice (iDikeni)
 Aliwal North (Maletswai) 
 Sophangisa's land
 Barkly East
 Bethulie
 Berlin
 Bisho (Bhisho)
 Braunschweig
 Burgersdorp
 Cala
 Cathcart
 Cedarville
 Cofimvaba
 Dohne
 Dordrecht
 East London (eMonti)
 Elliot (Khowa)
 Engcobo (Ngcobo)
 Fort Beaufort (eBhofolo)
 Gonubie
 Haga-Haga
 Hamburg
 Hogsback
 Hofmeyr
 Indwe
 Jamestown
 Katberg
 Kei Mouth
 Keiskammahoek
 Kidds Beach
 King William's Town (Qonce)
 Komga
 Lady Frere (Cacadu)
 Lady Grey
 Maclear (Nqanqarhu)
 Mdantsane
 Hertzog (Mhlangeni)
 Molteno
 Morgan's Bay
 Mount Frere
 Oyster Bay
 Peddie
 Queenstown (Komani)
 Seymour
 Sterkspruit
 Sterkstroom
 Stutterheim
 Tarkastad
 Tsomo
 Venterstad
 Whittlesea
 Zwelitsha

The Western Region

 Aberdeen
 Addo
 Alexandria
 Bathurst
 Bedford
 Cookhouse
 Cradock
 Despatch
 Enon
 Port Elizabeth (Gqeberha)
 Graaff Reinet
 Grahamstown (Makhanda) 
 Hankey
 Humansdorp
 Jeffreys Bay
 Joubertina
 Kareedouw
 Kenton-on-Sea
 Kirkwood
 Krakeelrivier
 Middelburg
 Nieu-Bethesda
 Patensie
 Paterson
 Port Alfred
 Salem
 Somerset East
 St Francis Bay
 Steynsburg, Eastern Cape
 Steytlerville
 Uitenhage (Kariega)
 Willowmore

The Wild Coast

 Bizana
 Butterworth (Gcuwa)
 Kentani (Centane)
 Cintsa (Chintsa)
 Coffee Bay
 Elliotdale
 Flagstaff
 Idutywa (Dutywa)
 Lady Frere (Cacadu)
 Libode
 Lusikisiki
 Matatiele
 Mount Fletcher (Tlokoeng)
 Mount Ayliff (eMaxesibeni)
 Mount Frere (KwaBhaca)
 Nqamakwe
 Ngqeleni
 Port St Johns
 Qolora Mouth
 Qumbu
 Tabankulu (Ntabankulu)
 Tsolo
 Umtata (Mthatha)
 Willowvale (Gatyane)

 

 
Eastern Cape
Cities and towns